SIONICS (acronym for Studies In the Operational Negation of Insurgents and Counter-Subversion) was an American company producing firearm suppressors (also called "silencers"). It was founded in the 1960s by Mitchell WerBell, a former OSS and CIA officer.

History 
The company was originally formed to design silencers for the M16 rifle. Later, WerBell began work on designs for a low cost, efficient silencer for machine guns.

In 1967 WerBell partnered with Gordon B. Ingram, inventor of the MAC-10 submachine gun. They added Werbell's silencer to Ingram's SMG and attempted to market it to the U.S. military for use in the Vietnam War. The silencer was the M14SS-1, designed for the M14 rifle, and forty suppressors were sent unofficially to the 9th Infantry Division in Vietnam during early 1969 for combat evaluation, and an undisclosed number were procured under ENSURE Number 360.1, but the suppressor was not adopted officially.

To obtain capital for manufacturing, Werbell solicited 29 investors for 7 million dollars each into a holding company called Quantum Ordnance Bankers. They created a manufacturing corporation called Military Armament Corporation, and merged it with Quantum and SIONICS. The efforts to sell to the military failed and Werbell lost control of the company.

Other companies 
SIONICS Weapon Systems, which manufactures AR-15 type rifles in Tucson, Arizona, has no relationship to the original SIONICS, beyond the name.

References 

Firearm manufacturers of the United States
Defunct manufacturing companies of the United States